Gypsy was a 1929 Broadway three-act play written by Maxwell Anderson
and produced by Richard Herndon and directed by George Cukor. It ran for 64 performances from 
January 14, 1929, to March 1929 at the Klaw Theatre. It was included in Burns Mantle's 
The Best Plays of 1928-1929.

Cast

 Louis Calhern as Cleve
 Ruth Findlay as Sylvia
 Wallace Ford as Mac
 Claiborne Foster as Ellen
 Jefferson Hall as Janitor
 Lester Vail as David
 Mary Young as Marilyn

References

External links 
 

Plays by Maxwell Anderson
1929 plays
Broadway plays
Plays set in New York City